The 1989–90 Toshiba Rugby Union County Championship was the 90th edition of England's County Championship rugby union club competition.

Lancashire won their 14th title after defeating Middlesex in the final.

First Round

Second Round

Third Round

Semi finals 

+ won by virtue of scoring more tries

Final

See also
 English rugby union system
 Rugby union in England

References

Rugby Union County Championship
County Championship (rugby union) seasons